Li Tao (born 8 March 1968) is a Chinese swimmer. He competed in the men's 4 × 100 metre freestyle relay at the 1988 Summer Olympics.

References

External links
 

1968 births
Living people
Olympic swimmers of China
Swimmers at the 1988 Summer Olympics
Place of birth missing (living people)
Chinese male freestyle swimmers